Crown Lands is a Canadian rock music duo from Oshawa, Ontario. 

The band consists of vocalist and drummer Cody Bowles, and guitarist, bassist and keyboardist Kevin Comeau. Bowles is Mik'maq and Two-Spirit, while Comeau is Jewish. With prog-rock influences, the duo compose music and lyrics inspired by Indigenous resistance to colonialism.  They have stated that their name, "Crown Lands", communicates a desire to disrupt the concept of Canadian "crown land", or government-held lands stolen from First Nations.

Crown Lands won the Juno Award for Breakthrough Group of the Year at the Juno Awards of 2021. The band were also nominated for Rock Album of the Year.

History
The band was formed in 2015 by Kevin Comeau and Cody Bowles, who began jamming in a friend's barn. Comeau studied classical music at Western University in London, Ontario, and Bowles studied psychology and music at York University in Toronto. Their first EP, Mantra, was released on August 18, 2016. They released their second EP Rise Over Run on September 8, 2017. It includes the band's single "Mountain", about colonialism and the history of residential schools in Canada. In 2018, the band opened for Jack White on the Canadian leg of his tour. On June 11, 2020, they released the acoustic EP Wayward Flyers, Vol. 1 on Universal, featuring a cover of Neil Young's "Birds".

Their full-length self-titled debut album was released on August 13, 2020, and was produced in Nashville by Dave Cobb. The album was preceded by the single "End of the Road", a protest song about the issue of missing and murdered Indigenous women whose video features narration by Tanya Tagaq.

Their March 2021 single "Context: Fearless Pt. 1" is a tribute to the band Rush, a 10-part song with sections referencing Rush's work. They made a demo of the song with Terry Brown, producer of Rush's first nine albums, and later worked on the track with Nick Raskulinecz, co-producer of two Rush albums, and Rush producer David Bottrill.

In July 2021, the band released the single "White Buffalo", along with "The Oracle", both produced by David Bottrill. Both songs were included on the band's four-track EP White Buffalo, released on September 16, 2021, on Spinefarm Records / Universal Music Canada. The band describes "White Buffalo" as the third in a trilogy of songs about Indigenous resistance, including "Mountain" and "End of the Road".

In October and November 2022, the band opened for Michigan rock band Greta Van Fleet on their U.S. Tour.
On February 25, 2023 they released a new single called “Lady of the Lake.”

Members
 Cody Bowles (vocals, drums)
 Kevin Comeau (guitar, bass, keyboards)

Awards

Discography

Studio Albums

Live Albums

EPs

Singles
 "Mountain" (2018)
 "Feeling Good" (2020)
 "End of the Road" (2020)
 "Context: Fearless Pt. 1" (2021)
 "White Buffalo" (2021)
 "Come Together" (2022)

References

Canadian hard rock musical groups
Canadian progressive rock groups
First Nations musical groups
Musical groups from Oshawa
Musical groups established in 2015
2015 establishments in Ontario
Juno Award for Breakthrough Group of the Year winners